Vikramsinh Balasaheb Sawant is a leader of Indian National Congress and a member of the Maharashtra Legislative Assembly elected from 
Jat Assembly constituency in Sangli city.

Positions held
 2019: Elected to Maharashtra Legislative Assembly.

References

1972 births
Living people
Members of the Maharashtra Legislative Assembly
Indian National Congress politicians from Maharashtra
People from Sangli